The 1960 Bathurst 100 was a motor race staged at the Mount Panorama Circuit near Bathurst in New South Wales, Australia on 18 April 1960. The race was contested over 26 laps at a total distance of approximately 100 miles and it was Round 2 of the 1960 Australian Drivers' Championship.

The race was won by Alec Mildren driving a Cooper T51 Maserati.

Results

References

Bathurst 100
Motorsport in Bathurst, New South Wales